Najami Ghani Shaer (also Romanized as Najamī Ghanī Shāʿer) is a village in Bandan Rural District, in the Central District of Nehbandan County, South Khorasan Province, Iran. At the 2006 census, its population was 86, in 18 families.

References 

Populated places in Nehbandan County